Tingha may refer to:

 Tingha, New South Wales
 Tingha and Tucker